Miss Polonia 2010 was the 36th Miss Polonia pageant, held on December 11, 2010. The winner was Rozalia Mancewicz of Podlasie and she represented Poland in Miss Universe 2011 and Miss International 2012.

Final results

Special Awards

Official Delegates

Notes

Withdrawals
 Lubusz
 Warmia-Masuria
 Polish Community in Australia
 Polish Community in Sweden

Did not compete
 Polish Community in Argentina
 Polish Community in Belarus
 Polish Community in Brazil
 Polish Community in Canada
 Polish Community in France
 Polish Community in Germany
 Polish Community in Ireland
 Polish Community in Israel
 Polish Community in Russia
 Polish Community in South Africa
 Polish Community in the U.K.
 Polish Community in the U.S.
 Polish Community in Venezuela

References

External links
Official Website

2010
2010 beauty pageants
2010 in Poland